Admiral Cyril Everard Tower, DSO (3 December 1861 – 20 January 1929) was a Royal Navy officer.

References 

1861 births
1929 deaths
Royal Navy admirals
Royal Navy admirals of World War I
Companions of the Order of the Bath
Place of birth missing
Place of death missing
Royal Navy personnel of the Anglo-Egyptian War